Kaszuba is a Polish-language surname, meaning "Kashubian". It may be transliterated as Kashuba (Russian and Ukrainian), Kašuba (Lithuanian), Kachouba (French-style), or Kaschuba (German).

People with this surname include:
 Aleksandra Kasuba (1923–2019), Lithuanian-American environmental artist
 Angela Kashuba, pharmacologist
 Jakub Kaszuba (born 1988), Polish footballer
 Kazimierz Kaszuba (1930–1990), Polish footballer
 Oleksandra Kashuba (born 1996), Ukrainian synchronized swimmer
  (1913–1944), Soviet military pilot
 Romualdas Kasuba (1931–2019), Lithuanian-American engineer
 Valentina Kachouba (1898–1997), Russian dancer
 Valery Kashuba (born 1984), Kyrgyzstani footballer
  (1900–1963), Soviet general
 Vytautas Kašuba, Lithuanian sculptor
 Michal Kašuba (born 1988) Czech mechanical engineer

See also
 
 
 

Polish-language surnames